All About Love may refer to:

Film
 All About Love (2001 film), a French film
 All About Love (2005 film), a Hong Kong romance
 All About Love (2006 film), a Philippine anthology film
 All About Love (2010 film), a Hong Kong film
 All About Loving, a 1964 French comedy film

Music
 "All About Love", a song from the 1975 Earth, Wind & Fire album That's the Way of the World
 All About Love (Joyce Sims album), 1989
 All About Love (Johnny Mathis album), 1996
 All About Love (Steven Curtis Chapman album), 2003
 All About Love (Yeng Constantino album), 2014
 All About Love, an album by Laila
 All About Love, an album by Roger Whittaker

Other uses
 All About Love: New Visions, a 2001 book by bell hooks